Bowesfield is an area of Stockton-on-Tees, County Durham, England. The area is located in the Parkfield & Oxbridge ward to the south of the town centre.  The area is a mix of industrial, residential, and open space. 

The name Bowesfield, through Bowesfield Lane, can be found from Oxbridge Lane (just south of the town centre) through eastern Parkfield and down to Tees Jubilee Bridge. The former Bowesfield Farm originally over-looked old Thornaby on the opposite bank of the River Tees.

Parkfield
Parkfield, named after Ropner Park to the west, includes Bowesfield Primary School,

Churches

Parkfield is noted for its amount of religious institutions. They are churches: St Peter's (CoE), Church of Nazarene, St Cuthbert's (Roman Catholic), Jubilee York Road (Methodist) Stockton (United Reformed), Rivers of Life (Christian Fellowship), New Life and the former Holy Trinity. Mosques are also found: Jamia Al Bihal and Farooq E Azam.

Sea Also
Bowesfield Works
Stockton railway station (S&D)
Hartburn
Preston-on-Tees
Ingleby Barwick

References 

Stockton-on-Tees
Suburbs in the United Kingdom